Yonghuang (Manchu:  Yong huwang; 5 July 1728 – 21 April 1750) was an imperial prince of the Manchu-led Qing dynasty in China. Born in the Aisin Gioro clan, he was the eldest son of the Qianlong Emperor. His mother was Imperial Noble Consort Zhemin.

Life
His mother Imperial Noble Consort Zhemin died when he was very young. In 1748, while the Qianlong Emperor was on an inspection tour in southern China, his first empress consort, Empress Xiaoxianchun, died. Yonghuang, as the emperor's eldest son, was tasked with overseeing the empress's funeral. Yonghuang and his third brother, Yongzhang (永璋; 1735–1760), did not mourn the empress as deeply as expected. When the Qianlong Emperor found out later, he was extremely displeased, so he reprimanded Yonghuang and Yongzhang and removed them from his list of potential successors.

Yonghuang died in 1750. The Qianlong Emperor deeply regretted his earlier decision but it was too late. He gave Yonghuang the posthumous title "Prince Ding'an of the First Rank".

Family 
Primary Consort

 Primary consort, of the Ilari clan (嫡福晉 伊拉里氏)
 Miande, Prince of the Fourth Rank (貝子 綿德; 11 August 1747 – 17 November 1786), first son

Secondary Consort

 Secondary consort, of the Irgen Gioro clan (側福晉 伊爾根覺羅氏)
 Mian'en, Prince Dinggong of the First Rank (定恭親王 綿恩; 18 September 1747 – 18 July 1822), second son

Ancestry

In fiction and popular culture
 Portrayed by Ding Qiao in Ruyi's Royal Love in the Palace (2018)

See also 
 Prince Ding
 Royal and noble ranks of the Qing dynasty#Male members
 Ranks of imperial consorts in China#Qing

References
 

1728 births
1750 deaths
Qianlong Emperor's sons
Prince Ding
Qing dynasty imperial princes